Dodgen Middle School is a middle school located in East Cobb, Georgia, United States, and is part of the Cobb County School District. As of 2019, the current principal is Dr. Patrcia Alford, and its assistant principals are Bradley Blackman and Andrew Lorentz.

As of the 2018-19 school year, the school had an enrollment of 1,246 students and 67 teachers, for a student–teacher ratio of 18.61.

Awards and achievements
In 2013, Dodgen Middle School was awarded the Georgia Schools of Excellence Award by Barack Obama. In the 2011–2012 school year, Dodgen Middle School was named as a participating school in The Clean Air Campaign. 

Dodgen's Science Olympiad team won their state competition in 2013 and then became the first Cobb County middle school to qualify for the national competition. The team also won first place in the state competition in all four years during 2015–2018.

In 2017, the Dodgen Orchestra won first place in the Middle School Division of the National Orchestra Festival held by the American String Teachers Association in Pittsburgh, Pennsylvania.

In 2018, one of Dodgen's 7th grade math teachers, Fred Veeder, was announced CCSD Teacher of the Year.

In 2012 a statue was unveiled commemorating Doug Sklenka's streak of 144 straight 4 square victories to cap off an undefeated 6th grade year. Sklenka won an additional 101 tether ball games, another record that still stands today.

References

External links
 Dodgen website

Middle schools in Georgia (U.S. state)